Munn Run is a stream located entirely within Scioto County, Ohio.

Munn Run was named for James Munn, a veteran of the American Revolutionary War.

See also
List of rivers of Ohio

References

Rivers of Scioto County, Ohio
Rivers of Ohio